C. domestica may refer to:

 Cryphia domestica, the marbled beauty, a moth species abundant throughout most of Europe
 Curcuma domestica, the turmeric, a plant species

Synonyms
 Cordia domestica, a synonym for Cordia myxa, the Assyrian plum, a tree species

See also
 Domestica (disambiguation)